Sheila Jane Silver (born October 3, 1946) is an American composer.

Early life and studies
Sheila Silver was born in Seattle, Washington in 1946, the youngest daughter of Robert and Fannie Silver. She started piano studies at the age of five. After two years at the University of Washington, she transferred to the University of California where she received a Bachelor of Arts in 1968. She then studied with Erhard Karkoschka at the State University of Music and Performing Arts Stuttgart, and with György Ligeti in Berlin and later in Hamburg. She attended the 1970 Darmstadt Summer Institute, and spent a summer at the Tanglewood Music Center (1972) where she studied with Jacob Druckman.  At Brandies University she studied with Arthur Berger and Harold Shapero, earning her PhD in 1976.

Silver is Professor Emerita at the State University of New York at Stony Brook and served as Visiting Professor at the College of William and Mary.

Career
Silver has merged tonal and atonal elements in works starting with her 1979 Canto, A Setting of Ezra Pound’s Canto XXXIX, for baritone and chamber ensemble (commissioned by the Berkshire Music Center at Tanglewood). Richard Dyer wrote in the Boston Globe of the world premiere, “Sheila Silver’s Canto matches Pound’s text with music of a comparably audacious directness, simplicity, and specificity and therefore boldly occupies a psycho-spiritual region that few other composers have cared to approach; it is a beautiful work.” Silver often finds inspiration in non-Western musical traditions, such as Hebraic Chant, (Shirat Sara and Cello Sonata), Sikh prayer mantras (The Thief of Love, Ek Ong Kar,) or Hindustani music (A Thousand Splendid Suns). She collects Tibetan singing bowls and has used them in compositions such as Being in Life and The White Rooster. Critics have praised Silver’s work for being modern and accessible. Cary Smith in the Journal American wrote: “To the Spirit Unconquered is one of those rare compositions that grabs you emotionally and will not let you go. It is a stunning modern masterpiece, a work of profound musical and emotional depth.”

Her Piano Concerto was written for pianist Alexander Paley and premiered by the American Composers Orchestra at Carnegie Hall in 1996. Said Steve Schwarz, in Classical Net, the Concerto "speaks with what I'd call a depth of discourse...it bespeaks a maturity of mind and culture found in few composers."

Film music
Silver has scored three independent feature films directed by her husband, John Feldman,: Alligator Eyes, Dead Funny and Who the Hell is Booby Roos?, winner of the Seattle International Film Festival’s New American Cinema Award in 2002. She also scored Feldman’s much acclaimed documentary about the scientist Lynn Margulis, Symbiotic Earth, and is currently working on the score for his new documentary, Regenerating Life.

Vocal music

Silver has written several song cycles. Beauty Intolerable: A Songbook based on the poetry of Edna St. Vincent Millay includes 14 songs and two rounds by this American iconic poet. It can be heard on a 2021 album released by Albany Records and starring singers Dawn Upshaw, Stephanie Blythe, Sidney Outlaw, Deanne Meek, Lucy Fitz Gibbon, pianists Gilbert Kalish, Warren Jones, and other musicians. Of the recording, American Record Guide says “Silver...writes music that marries the delicious bitterness of jazzy discord with lush, cool harmonies and merges the two harmonic moods together with ease...The music is just as rich and captivating as the text that inspired it, and the splendid performances by this top-notch cast of artists are not a surprise. Spend some time with Edna and Sheila and Sappho and the rest.”

In 2021, Silver completed an opera based on Khaled Hosseini's novel A Thousand Splendid Suns with a libretto by her long-time collaborator, Stephen Kitsakos. It was premiered by the Seattle Opera in February 2023. In preparation for composing this opera, she undertook a study of Hindustani music, making multiple trips to India between 2013-2020  to study with Pandit Kedar Bodas in Pune. Silver’s intention is to take color and inspiration for her Western musical voice from Hindustani music.

Awards and honors
In addition to grants and commissions from such organizations as the Paul Fromm Foundation, the Barlow Foundation, the National Endowment for the Arts, the Rockefeller Foundation, the Cary Trust, Chamber Music America, and Opera America, Silver’s honors include:
 invited to be the Elliot Carter Resident Composer at the American Academy in Rome (Spring 2020)
 Guggenheim Fellowship (2013) 
 The Raymond and Beverly Sackler Prize in Music Composition in Opera (2007—for The Wooden Sword)
 American Academy of Arts and Letters Composer Award (1986) 
 Twice winner of the ISCM National Composers Competition (1982 and 1983)
 The Rome Prize in Music Composition (1979)
 The Radcliffe Institute Fellowship (1977)
 The George Ladd Prix de Paris (1969–71)
 Koussevitzky Fellowship

List of works

Orchestral works
 Being in Life, Concerto for Horn/Alphorn, string orchestra, and Tibetan singing bowls (2019)
 Midnight Prayer (2003)
 Piano Concerto (1996)
 Three Preludes for Orchestra (1992)
 Song of Sara for string orchestra (1985/87)
 Chariessa, for soprano and orchestra (1980)

Operatic works
A Thousand Splendid Suns, 2021 (based on the novel by Khaled Hosseini)
 The Wooden Sword, 2010 (chamber opera based on an international folktale)
 The Tale of the White Rooster, 2010 (chamber opera about Tibetan nuns escaping across the Tibetan Indian border)
 The Thief of Love, 1986 (based on a 17th century Bengali court tale as told by Bharatchandra)

Vocal works 
 On Loving: Three Songs for Diane Kalish in memoriam (2016)
 Beauty Intolerable: A Songbook based on the poetry of Edna St. Vincent Millay (2013)
 Transcending: Three Songs for Michael Dash, in memoriam (1999)
 Ek Ong Kar, a capella chorus (1983)
 Canto: A Setting of Ezra Pound’s Canto XXIX for baritone and chamber ensemble (1979)
 Chariessa: A Cycle of Six Songs on Fragments from Sappho (1978)

Chamber
 Resilient Earth: Six Preludes for Piano and Four Caprices for Solo Violin (2022)
 Three Etudes, for Trumpet (2020)
 Toccata and Nocturne, for solo piano, inspired by Raga Jog (2016/18)
 Down by the River, for trombone quartet (2016)
 Hazim’s Dance, for string trio, harp, and oboe (2008)
 Twilight’s Last Gleaming, for two pianos and percussion (2007)
 Chant, for contrabass and piano (2004)
 Moon Prayer, for string sextet (2002)
 Music Visions (Subway Sunset and As the Earth Turns), for woodwinds and video (1999/2000)
 Lullaby, for bassoon or bass clarinet and piano, (1999)
 Four Etudes and a Fantasy, for string quartet (1996)
 From Darkness Emerging, for string quartet and harp (1995)
 To the Spirit Unconquered, for piano trio, inspired by the writings of Primo Levi (1992) 
 Six Preludes for Piano on poems of Baudelaire (1991)
 Cello Sonata (1988)
 Dance Converging, for horn, viola, piano, and percussion (1987)

Film scores
 Alligator Eyes
 Dead Funny
 Who the Hell is Booby Roos?
 Symbiotic Earth

Discography
 Beauty Intolerable: Songs of Sheila Silver (2021), CD, (TROY 1854-55) with Dawn Upshaw, Stephanie Blythe, Sidney Outlaw, Lucy Fitz Gibbon, Deanne Meek, Risa Renae Harman, Gilbert Kalish, Timothy Long, Kayo Iwama, Warren Jones, Ryan M. McCullough
 Beauty Intolerable, A Songbook based on the poetry of Edna St. Vincent Millay
 On Loving, Three Songs for Diane Kalish, in memoriam
 Transcending, Three Songs for Michael Dash, in memoriam
 Chariessa, A Cycle of Six Songs on Fragments from Sappho
 Nocturne, Inspired by Raga Jog, for solo piano

 String Quartet (2011) (NWCRL 520) Atlantic String Quartet
 Twilight’s Last Gleaming (2009) (Bridge 9319 - Stony Brook Soundings) Pianists: Gilbert Kalish, Christina Dahl. Percussion: Eduardo Leandro, Kevin Dufford
 Six préludes pour piano, d’après poèmes de Baudelaire (2009) (TROY 1087) Tanya Bannister, piano
 Shirat Sara (Song of Sarah) (2004) Milken Archive (Naxos 8.559426) Gerard Schwarz and the Seattle Symphony Strings
 Piano Concerto and Six Preludes for Piano on Poems of Baudelaire (2003) (Naxos 8.557015) with Alexander Paley, piano, Lithuanian State Symphony Orchestra, Guntaras Rinkevicius, conductor
 To the Spirit Unconquered (1996) (CRI 708) The Guild Trio: Janet Orenstein, violin; Brooks Whitehouse, cello; Patricia Tao, piano; Gilbert Kalish, piano; Lois Martin, viola; William Purvis, French horn; Lisa Moore, piano; Thad Wheeler, percussion
  Dance Converging 
  Dynamis 
  Six Preludes for Piano on poems of Baudelaire

 Ek Ong Kar (1987) (GSS 107) The Gregg Smith Singers
 Canto,  A Setting of Ezra Pound’s Canto XXIX (1979) (Mode 23) Musicians' Accord ensemble, Michael Dash, baritone, Sheila Silver, cond. 
 Cello Sonata (1977) (CRI 590) Timothy Eddy, cello, Gilbert Kalish, piano

References

Further reading

 Webber, Sandra J. 1993. "A Composer and Her Personal Voice" The New York Times (March 21)

External links

Recordings of Sheila Silver’s Music
Sheila Silver at Naxos Records
Order Sheila Silver’s Music from Keiser Southern Music
Review of Beauty Intolerable: Songs of Sheila Silver
American Opera Projects Spotlight on Sheila Silver
Berkshire Eagle: Tyne Daly to read Millay poems to Sheila Silver’s cycle of songs
Rediscover the Unconquerable Spirit of Sheila Silver
Sheila Silver Composer Portrait at Merkin Hall
Overview of Silver’s career at Musica Kaleidoskopea
 

1946 births
20th-century American composers
20th-century American women musicians
20th-century classical composers
20th-century women composers
21st-century American composers
21st-century American women musicians
21st-century classical composers
21st-century women composers
American classical composers
American opera composers
American women classical composers
Brandeis University alumni
Classical musicians from Washington (state)
College of William & Mary faculty
Jewish American classical composers
Living people
Musicians from Seattle
Pupils of Jacob Druckman
Stony Brook University faculty
University of California, Berkeley alumni
Women in classical music
Women opera composers